Sean Bubin (born January 26, 1981) is a former American football offensive lineman of the National Football League. Originally a fifth-round pick out of the University of Illinois in 2004 by the Jacksonville Jaguars, Bubin spent time with the Jaguars, Detroit Lions, and Minnesota Vikings. He has also played for the Hamburg Sea Devils of NFL Europe. Bubin retired on April 20, 2007, after spending half the previous season on the practice squad of the New England Patriots.

External links
Bubin Retires, The Boston Globe, April 20, 2007 (accessed 8 July 2007).

1981 births
Living people
American football offensive tackles
Illinois Fighting Illini football players
Jacksonville Jaguars players
Detroit Lions players
Minnesota Vikings players
New England Patriots players
Hamburg Sea Devils players